Ethylenediaminediacetic acid (EDDA) is the organic compound with the formula C2H4(NHCH2CO2H)2.  It is a derivative of two molecules of glycine, wherein the amines are linked.  It is a white solid.

The conjugate base is a tetradentate ligand.   A representative complex is Na[Co(EDDA)(CO3)].

References

Chelating agents
Dicarboxylic acids